Paulo Miranda Nascimento (born August 14, 1981), also known as Pirula or Pirulla, is a Brazilian paleontologist, YouTuber, zoologist, lecturer and a scientific disseminator.

Pirula is a bachelor of Biology by Mackenzie Presbyterian University and, he is master and PhD in Zoology by University of São Paulo. His PhD thesis is named "Revision of the Baurusuchidae family and its phylogenetic affinities within Mesoeucrocodylia". Paulo has also been a professor of evolution and palaeontology in colleges and schools.

Pirula created his YouTube channel in 2006, named Canal do Pirulla, in which he discusses science, environment, religion and politics, in long and detailed videos.

Pirula has been awarded the Social Media Education Influencer Award in the sixth edition of the Shorty Awards, in 2014. In 2016, together with Laranjeira, Simões, Estevão and other Brazilian social media influencers, Pirula founded another YouTube channel, Bláblálogia, also focused in communicating science to common audiences.

As a critic of the means Brazilian media portraits scientific topics, Pirula was one of the founders of the Science Vlogs Brazil project, a conglomerate of YouTube channels focused on science and education which aims to unify Brazilian popular science influencers against fake news and anti-scientific information on the internet.

In July 2019, together with Gilmar Lopes the creator and maintainer of the fact-checking website E-farsas, he debuted a series of videos named "Fake em Nóis" on the MOV.show channel, which belongs to the producer MOV on the UOL portal.

In March 2023, Pirula's Youtube channel has more than 1.04 million subscribers and more than 122 million views.

Works 

 Darwin sem frescura, co-author: Reinaldo José Lopes. HarperCollins Brasil (2019).

References

Shorty Award winners
Brazilian science writers
Academic staff of Mackenzie Presbyterian University
Mackenzie Presbyterian University alumni
Brazilian atheists
Brazilian YouTubers
Brazilian paleontologists
1981 births
Living people